The General Electric H-Series is a family of turboprop aircraft engines produced by GE BGA Turboprops. The initial H80 is an updated derivative of the Walter M601, while the H75 and H85 are later derivatives.

Development

The H80 was launched in 2009 based on the M601. GE added a new compressor, blisks, blades and new stators to enhance power by 3% and boost efficiency by 10%.
It reaches  (shaft horsepower) from the M601-F's , and improves hot and high performance.

The H80 was certificated by EASA at 13 December 2011, followed by the FAA at 13 March 2012. Its Russian type certificate was received in October 2012, and the engine also approved by Brazilian Civil Aviation agency (ANAC) and the Argentine Administración Nacional de Aviación Civil.

Its Electronic Engine and Propeller Control (EEPC) system received EASA type certification in late 2016.
The Diamond Dart 550 military trainer is due to fly it in early 2018 and it will be certified on the Thrush 510G crop duster in this year.

Design

The two-shaft, reverse flow design is derived from the Walter M601: its core features a two-stage axial and single-stage centrifugal compressor, an annular combustor and a single turbine stage, and its propulsion section is powered by a single-stage turbine driving a two-stage planetary gearbox.
GE redesigned the compressor with 3D aero to improve its pressure ratio and upgraded the hot section and turbine stages with modern metal alloys for higher temperatures with the same durability.

The H75-100 weighs  more than the equivalent PT6 but pioneers single lever electronic propeller and engine control in general aviation, for an initial TBO of 4,000 hr which could be increased with experience.
It promises 10% better fuel burn, 10% longer overhaul and lower maintenance costs than the PT6A-135 for the Nextant G90XT.

Variants

H80 formerly the M601H-80
H75 750 shp or 550 shp derivatives
H75-A 550 shp derivative with aerobatic modifications
H85 850 shp derivative

Applications

 CAIGA Primus 150 (H85)
 Diamond Dart 550 (H75-100)
 Dornier Do-28 G92 (H75-200)
 Let L-410 Turbolet UVP-E20 (H80-200) and L-410NG (H85)
 Nextant G90XT (H75-100)
 Technoavia Rysachok (H80)
 Thrush Model 510 (H80)

Specification (H80)

See also

References

External links
 H-Series | GE Aviation
 EASA type certification data sheet 
 GE Aviation Set to Begin Testing of its New H80 Turboprop Engine
 H80 on LeteckeMotory.cz (cs)

2000s turboprop engines